Dr. Ferenc Finkey (30 January 1870 – 23 January 1949) was a Hungarian jurist, who served as Crown Prosecutor of Hungary from 1935 to 1940.

He became an ordinary member of the Hungarian Academy of Sciences in 1929. He was elected to the House of Magnates in 1939. His work is lasting value in the area of substantive criminal law and criminal procedural law.

Publications
 Az egység és többség tana a büntetőjogban (Sárospatak, 1895) 
 A magyar büntetőeljárás tankönyve (Budapest, 1899) 
 A börtönügy jelen állapota és reformkérdései (Budapest, 1904) 
 A tételes jog alapelvei és vezéreszméi (Budapest, 1908)
 A magyar büntető perjog tankönyve (Budapest, 1916)
 A magyar anyagi büntetőjog jelen állapota (Budapest, 1923)
 Büntetéstani problémák (Budapest, 1933)

References
 Magyar Életrajzi Lexikon

External links
 

1870 births
1949 deaths
People from Sárospatak
Hungarian jurists
Members of the Hungarian Academy of Sciences